The 2022 Albanian Cup Final was a football match that was played on 31 May 2022 to decide the winner of the 2021–22 Albanian Cup, the 70th edition of the Albanian Cup. The match was played between Vllaznia and Laçi at the Arena Kombëtare in Tirana. Vllaznia won the match 2−1 after extra time to earn their eighth Albanian Cup title.

Match

Details

References

Cup Final
2022
Albanian Cup
Sports competitions in Tirana
Albanian Cup Final, 2022
Albanian Cup Final, 2022